Island (stylized as iSLAND) is the fifth studio album by American hip hop duo G-Side. It was released by Slow Motion Soundz on November 11, 2011.

Critical reception

Evan Rytlewski of The A.V. Club gave the album a grade of B+, writing, "There are hundreds of rappers dwelling on the same themes of hustle and determination as Yung Clova and ST 2 Lettaz, including some that do so with nimbler flows and sharper wordplay, but there are few that match the duo's personality and conviction." Tom Breihan of Stereogum commented that "Production team Block Beattaz has made another zoned-out polyglot music tapestry for them, sampling stuff like Joy Orbison and Tame Impala but grounding it in classic Southern rap thump."

Track listing

References

External links
 

2011 albums
G-Side albums